Jijhaul  is a village development committee in Siraha District in the Sagarmatha Zone of south-eastern Nepal. In accordance with the 1991 Nepal census it had a population of 3719 people living in 697 individual households.

References

External links
UN map of the municipalities of  Siraha District

Populated places in Siraha District